Nakhla (sometimes written Nekhla) is a town and commune in Robbah District, El Oued Province, Algeria. According to the 2008 census it has a population of 12,652, up from 9,491 in 1998, with an annual growth rate of 3.0%.

Climate

Nakhla has a hot desert climate (Köppen climate classification BWh), with very hot summers and mild winters. Rainfall is light and sporadic, and summers are particularly dry.

Transportation

It is also connected to Robbah to the west, El Ogla to the south, and Trifaoui to the north.

Education

4.9% of the population has a tertiary education, and another 12.9% has completed secondary education. The overall literacy rate is 73.8%, and is 81.4% among males and 65.9% among females.

Localities
The commune of Nakhla is composed of three localities:

Nakhla
Nakhla Gherbia
Khobna

References

Neighbouring towns and cities

Communes of El Oued Province
Algeria